The first season of the American television series Loki, based on Marvel Comics featuring the character of the same name, sees Loki brought to the mysterious Time Variance Authority (TVA) after stealing the Tesseract during the events of Avengers: Endgame (2019), and is forced to help catch a dangerous variant version of himself. It is set in the Marvel Cinematic Universe (MCU), sharing continuity with the films and television series of the franchise. The season was produced by Marvel Studios, with Michael Waldron serving as head writer and Kate Herron directing.

Tom Hiddleston reprises his role as Loki from the film series, with Gugu Mbatha-Raw, Wunmi Mosaku, Eugene Cordero, Tara Strong, Owen Wilson, Sophia Di Martino, Sasha Lane, Jack Veal, DeObia Oparei, Richard E. Grant, and Jonathan Majors also starring. Loki was officially confirmed among the various Disney+ series in development from Marvel Studios in November 2018, along with Hiddleston's involvement. Filming began in February 2020 in Atlanta, Georgia, but was halted in March due to the COVID-19 pandemic. Production resumed that September and completed in December. The series takes place after the events of the film Avengers: Endgame, in which an alternate version of Loki created a new timeline, diverging from the events of The Avengers (2012). The season has a crime thriller tone, and sets up the events of the MCU films Doctor Strange in the Multiverse of Madness (2022) and Ant-Man and the Wasp: Quantumania (2023).

The first season premiered on Disney+ on June 9, 2021, running for six episodes until July 14, as part of Phase Four of the MCU. The season has received positive reviews, with praise for the performances, musical score, and visuals. A second season was confirmed in July 2021.

Episodes

Cast and characters

Starring 

 Tom Hiddleston as Loki
 Hiddleston also portrays President Loki
 Gugu Mbatha-Raw as Ravonna Renslayer
 Mbatha-Raw also portrays Rebecca Tourminet
 Wunmi Mosaku as Hunter B-15
 Eugene Cordero as Casey and Hunter K-5E
 Tara Strong voices Miss Minutes
 Owen Wilson as Mobius M. Mobius
 Sophia Di Martino as Sylvie
 Sasha Lane as Hunter C-20
 Jack Veal as Kid Loki
 DeObia Oparei as Boastful Loki
 Richard E. Grant as Classic Loki
 Jonathan Majors as He Who Remains
 Majors also voices the Time-Keepers

Recurring and guest 
 Neil Ellice as Hunter D-90
 Jaimie Alexander as Sif (uncredited)
 Chris Hemsworth voices Throg (uncredited)

Production

Development 

In November 2018, Disney CEO Bob Iger confirmed that a series centered on Loki was in development for Disney+ from Marvel Studios and that Tom Hiddleston was expected to reprise his role from the Marvel Cinematic Universe (MCU) films. Michael Waldron was hired as head writer and executive producer of the series in February 2019, and was also set to write the first episode. Waldron felt the series was an opportunity for "chaos and fun", such as connecting Loki to the story of D. B. Cooper, and his pitch to Marvel was to create a "big, crazy, fun time adventure" that would explore a new corner of the MCU and do something unexpected in each episode that would "blow up" the audience's ideas of what the series is.Waldron had assumed the audience was expecting the show to be similar to Quantum Leap, with Loki influencing historical events. Kate Herron, a fan of Loki, prepared a 60-page document for her pitch to be the series' director, feeling that a display of passion for the character would differentiate her from more experienced directors that were being considered. After developing her pitch during several interviews over Zoom with Marvel Studios executives Kevin Wright and Stephen Broussard, the London-based Herron was flown to Burbank for a meeting with top executives including Feige, Victoria Alonso, and Louis D'Esposito. Wright believed Herron's pitch had a "complete vision" of how to take the ideas for the series and turn them into something "wholly unique" to the MCU. In August 2019, Feige met with Herron in London to offer her the job as director for the series. Within 48 hours, she flew to New York to meet Hiddleston and discuss the character with him, and then went on to Disney's D23 Expo event where she was announced as director and executive producer. Part of Herron's agreement to join the series was ensuring there was gender parity amongst the crew, particularly with the department heads. Daniel Kwan and Daniel Scheinert had also been approached to direct the season, but opted to pursue their own film project, Everything Everywhere All at Once (2022), which also dealt with multiversal concepts.

After Waldron signed on to write the MCU film Doctor Strange in the Multiverse of Madness (2022) in February 2020, writer Eric Martin was promoted to handle the day-to-day needs of the series including being the lead writer on set, with Waldron and Martin later collaborating on any rewrites for the series. The first season consists of six 40- to 50-minute episodes, equaling 280 minutes total. In addition to Waldron and Herron, executive producers for the series include Feige, D'Esposito, Alonso, Broussard, and Hiddleston. The season sees an alternate version of Loki brought to the mysterious Time Variance Authority (TVA) to help fix the timeline and stop a greater threat, ending up trapped in a crime thriller of his own making, traveling through time and altering human history.

Writing 
Elissa Karasik, Bisha K. Ali, Eric Martin, and Tom Kauffman served as writers for the season, with Jess Dweck also assisting, working for 20 weeks to create the season's scripts. Waldron found this period challenging because he also had to write the pilot episode, which is normally done in a separate development period before additional writers are hired, to establish the world of the series while conceiving story elements for the rest of the episodes. The basic structure of the season was determined in the first three weeks of work, knowing the first episode would see Loki interrogated, the second having "the police work" with Mobius M. Mobius, the third would see Loki and his female variant Sylvie on Lamentis, the fourth had "the conspiracy coming undone", the fifth would take place in the Void or "some form of it", and the final episode would be at the Citadel at the End of Time.

The season takes place after Avengers: Endgame (2019), which saw Loki steal the Tesseract during the 2012 events of The Avengers (2012) and unwittingly create an alternate timeline from the main MCU films. In the season, this "time variant" of Loki travels through time and alters human history, with the season exploring the questions "Where did Loki go after he picked up the Tesseract? Could Loki ever make a friend? [W]ill the sun ever shine on him again?". Exploring alternate timelines and the multiverse allowed Loki to introduce versions of other MCU characters in addition to other versions of Loki. Waldron also hoped to explore more complex character questions such as what makes a person "truly good or truly bad", and what makes a hero, a hero, or a villain, a villain. He added that the season's setting in an alternate timeline meant it did not have to deal with the "immediate grief and aftermath" of Endgame and could instead "blaze a little bit of a new trail into a new corner of the MCU", which differentiates it from Marvel Studios' previous two Disney+ series WandaVision and The Falcon and the Winter Soldier that are set shortly after Endgame.

Waldron's pitch for the season was to create "a big, crazy, fun time adventure" that would explore a new corner of the MCU, something Herron agreed with. This included introducing the Time Variance Authority (TVA), an organization that monitors the various timelines of the Multiverse. Feige and Broussard had hoped to introduce the TVA into the MCU for years, but the right opportunity did not present itself until Loki. The introduction of the TVA convinced Hiddleston to make the series. Waldron felt the organization was fun because it presents something as "remarkable" as time travel as "soulless" and bureaucratic. Herron infused the season's depiction of the TVA with details and knowledge from her time as a temp worker, and the writers added "fun flourishes of discontinued things" from the past that the TVA would be able to access such as drinks from the 1990s like Josta and BoKu. The hierarchy of the TVA and its "inner workings" are explored, with The Hudsucker Proxy (1994) a reference for Herron on the hierarchy.

The writers worked to conceive how time travel works at the TVA to ensure the audience would be able to easily grasp the concept and rules, expanding upon the method that was introduced in Avengers: Endgame. Waldron felt it was important to make this logic air-tight because, being a weekly series, the audience would have a week between each episode to "pick this apart". Speaking to the locations visited in the season, Waldron hoped to subvert the audience's expectations of Loki appearing at various monumental events in history, instead choosing to go places the audience knows "but didn't know well and maybe might be exciting to see".

Waldron felt that exploring the TVA's perspective on time and reality would help examine Loki's struggle with identity. He noted that the character had been out of control at pivotal parts of his life throughout the MCU films, and the TVA's place working with different timelines would take him further out of his comfort zone. Waldron explained that the nature of the work done by the TVA made the organization "uniquely suited to hold up a mirror to Loki and make him confront who he is and who he is supposed to be". Hiddleston also felt the season was about identity, as well as the difficulty of self-knowledge and self-acceptance, and "integrating the disparate fragments of the many selves that [Loki] can be", pointing to the series' logo, which features the "Loki" title shifting through various fonts, as an indication of this. As well, Hiddleston believed Loki was about the value of time and what it is worth to a person. Broussard stated that in addition to the time travel element, the season would have a "man-on-the-run quality to it", with Waldron adding that there was an unexpected science fiction quality to the season, which also explores mysterious conspiracies and bending reality. Loki also has murder mystery thriller elements. Love stories are also a part of the season, with Waldron highlighting the platonic love story between Loki and Mobius that is similar to the one between the characters Carl Hanratty and Frank Abagnale Jr. in Catch Me If You Can (2002). The season also sees Loki fall in love with Sylvie. This was a large part of Waldron's pitch for the series, noting they were uncertain if portraying Loki falling in love with another version of himself was "too crazy". He continued noting Loki was "ultimately about self-love, self-reflection, and forgiving yourself" and it "felt right" for the series be the character's first "real love story".

Waldron said the season was structured as individual short stories rather than a six-hour film split into episodes, comparing his approach to the series The Leftovers and Watchmen. The series Mad Men was a philosophical and aesthetic inspiration for Loki, since Waldron believed it was a good example of a "rich character study" which is what he was aiming for in Loki. Other inspirations include Before Sunrise (1995), Catch Me If You Can, Quentin Tarantino films, David Fincher films like Seven (1995) and Zodiac (2007), The Silence of the Lambs (1991), Toy Story (1995), Armageddon (1998), the series Lost, and the series Rick and Morty (which Waldron was a writer on). Loki does not adapt a particular storyline from the comics, despite various comic references appearing. The Kid Loki story in Journey into Mystery, written by Kieron Gillen, was an inspiration to Waldron because it explored the character's humanity in a vulnerable space that is only possible with a child (and not necessarily because there is a child version of Loki in the season).

Feige stated in November 2019 that the season would tie-into Doctor Strange in the Multiverse of Madness, but ahead of the season's premiere he would not reconfirm this or whether the season would tie in with any other MCU projects. However, he did say the season would be "tremendously important" and would "lay the groundwork" for the future of the MCU, having more impact on the MCU than WandaVision or The Falcon and the Winter Soldier did. Waldron noted that, as with all MCU properties, the aim was for Loki to have "wide-reaching ramifications" across the franchise. He collaborated closely with Jeff Loveness, the writer of the MCU film Ant-Man and the Wasp: Quantumania (2023), since that film deals with the Quantum Realm and is closely tied to the multiverse. As well, Ali became the head writer of the Marvel Studios series Ms. Marvel (2022). The "man behind the curtain" of the TVA is revealed to be He Who Remains, a variant of the Quantumania character Kang the Conqueror. Jonathan Majors portrays both roles, and Waldron felt it made "so much sense" to introduce Majors in the season since Kang is a "time-traveling, multiversal adversary" and thought to be the "next big cross-movie villain". The finale also sets up the events of Doctor Strange in the Multiverse of Madness, and elements of Spider-Man: No Way Home (2021). Broussard and Wright also met with Brad Winderbaum, executive producer of the animated What If...? series and WandaVision co-executive producer Mary Livanos to establish a "rule book" regarding the multiverse, its branch timelines, and nexus events. Chancellor Agard of Entertainment Weekly said that, while some MCU properties "have dealt with the fallout from previous entries", none have ever "attempted something so ambitious like this, in which several movies are dealing with a problem created by one thing".

Casting 
The starring cast for the season includes Hiddleston as Loki, Gugu Mbatha-Raw as Ravonna Renslayer, Wunmi Mosaku as Hunter B-15, Eugene Cordero as Casey and later Hunter K-5E, Tara Strong voicing Miss Minutes, Owen Wilson as Mobius M. Mobius, Sophia Di Martino as Sylvie, Sasha Lane as Hunter C-20, Jack Veal as Kid Loki, DeObia Oparei as Boastful Loki, Richard E. Grant as Classic Loki, and Jonathan Majors as He Who Remains.

Hiddleston also portrays President Loki, another variant of Loki who commands an army and is at odds with Kid Loki. Hiddleston called President Loki "the worst of the bad bunch", describing him as "the least vulnerable, the most autocratic and terrifyingly ambitious character who seems to have no empathy or care for anyone else". Mbatha-Raw also portrays Rebecca Tourminet, a vice-principal at a school in Fremont, Ohio, in 2018. Learning that there were different variants of Renslayer in different times was "mind blowing" to Mbatha-Raw. Majors also voices the "mindless android" Time-Keepers, in a reference to The Wizard of Oz where they are the Wizard and He Who Remains is the "man behind the curtain". Majors was shown the designs of each Time-Keeper and provided various options for each voice.

Neil Ellice recurs in the season as Hunter D-90. By December 2020, Jaimie Alexander was reported to be reprising her role as Sif in the series from past Thor films; she makes an uncredited cameo appearance in the season. Chris Hemsworth, who portrays Thor in the MCU, also has an uncredited cameo in the series providing voiceover for Throg.

Design 

Herron worked with costume designer Christine Wada to create costumes that were "an outer reflection of the inner story" and would reflect the "wear and tear" throughout the series. Loki has a multitude of costumes in the series that reflect his journey. Mobius' look in the series is meant to resemble Marvel Comics editor Mark Gruenwald, who was Marvel's "top continuity expert", as each member of the TVA in the comics is meant to be a clone of Gruenwald. Herron had initially imagined Mobius to have a scruffy look, but she and Wilson decided that it was not working. Wilson remembered a time he was on Saturday Night Live with silver hair and felt that would be an interesting direction to take the character; that ended up being part of the character's look. Di Martino noted Sylvie's "slightly disheveled" costume and broken horn headband were meant to help reflect the life she has had, with the costume and headband being similar to the Lady Loki design that appears in the Loki: Agent of Asgard comic series. Wada added concealed zippers to Di Martino's costume to allow her to breastfeed on set since Di Martino began work on the season four months after giving birth.

For the design for the TVA, Herron pulled visual inspiration from the films Metropolis (1927), Blade Runner (1982), and The Hitchhiker's Guide to the Galaxy (2005), and the Brutalist architecture of southeast London to mix with the "midwest style" of the series Mad Men. She also looked to the "retro-futuristic" visuals of Brazil (1985). From the comics, Herron was drawn to "these amazing images of desks going on into infinity" to incorporate into the TVA design. Production designer Kasra Farahani had similar inclinations as Herron for the design of the TVA, separately feeling Brazil would be a good inspiration since that film is "like this big bureaucracy crushing the individual". As with the Brutalist architecture Herron was drawn to, Farahani also looked to Soviet-influenced Eastern European midcentury modernism as well as American midcentury modernism for "the skinning, the palette, and the whimsical patterns" inside the TVA. Some parts of the TVA are constructed from the same stone that makes up the Citadel at the End of Time. The goal for Farahani was to create a space that "you can't tell immediately if this is a warm and friendly place or if it's a place that wants to destroy you".

The TVA includes "elaborate ceilings", with Farahani working alongside cinematographer Autumn Durald Arkapaw to incorporate lighting into them; when Arkapaw shot from a low angle, it produced "beautiful graphic frames with dynamic shapes in almost every background". Farahani described the technology of the TVA as if "analog technology never stopped and digital technology never happened", with the analog technology getting "more and more sophisticated"; this helped with the anachronistic feel of the organization. The various screens in the TVA do not feature color, instead having a monochromatic, 8-bit digitized look. Much of the technology was custom built from old televisions and computers that were combined with "disparate, other random pieces of tech", while the TemPads were inspired by calculator watches and their interfaces inspired by the Super Nintendo Entertainment System and Game Boy Camera. The world outside the TVA offices is depicted as an infinite city with inspiration from Metropolis and imagery of infinite spaces from the comic books, which Herron wanted to have a "level of unreality to it in some ways ... [because] it isn't on a planet and there isn't a sun". The majority of the season's locations and sets were 360 degree-builds on sound stages or a backlot, which gave Farahani greater control over the details and other aspects of the sets.

The series' main-on-end title sequence design was designed by Perception, and was inspired by the credits sequence of Seven. Loki was not originally intended to have a title sequence, but Herron enjoyed composer Natalie Holt's TVA theme so much, she decided a title sequence should be created around it.

Filming 
Filming began on February 10, 2020, at Pinewood Atlanta Studios in Atlanta, Georgia, with Herron directing, and Autumn Durald Arkapaw serving as cinematographer. The first season was filmed under the working title Architect. This was chosen as a reference to the Architect in The Matrix Reloaded (2003) and to serve as "[a] warning not to repeat what was done before us" since much of the season is expositional conversation and they did not want it to become the conversation between Neo and the Architect in Reloaded. Herron had a strong desire for Loki to be a love letter to science fiction films such as Brazil, Metropolis, The Hitchhiker's Guide to the Galaxy, and Alien (1979). She also took visual inspiration from the series Teletubbies, and the noir quality of Blade Runner. Arkapaw also drew inspiration from Blade Runner as well as Zodiac and Klute (1971). She used framing and lighting, "very 70s" filmmaking techniques, to help with the storytelling and was thoughtful on "how characters are moving through space", as well as haze. Herron pointed to Jurassic Park (1993) as an example of the "big sci-fi with heart" tone that the series was aiming for.

The season was shot on Sony Venice digital cameras with Panavision T-series anamorphic lenses. Arkapaw expanded and de-tuned these lenses to adjust their flare quality, fall off, and focal length. Location shooting took place in the Atlanta metropolitan area throughout the month of February. On March 14, filming for the series was halted due to the COVID-19 pandemic. Production resumed at Pinewood Atlanta Studios in September, and wrapped on December 5, 2020. The Atlanta Marriott Marquis portrayed the archives at the Time Variance Authority. On the TVA processing set, Arkapaw used working frosted incandescent ceiling lights as the set's key lights. Other Georgia locations used for filming included a quarry in northern Georgia that became the Lamentis-1 mining town and a vacant discount store that became the futuristic superstore, Roxxcart. Industrial Light & Magic's StageCraft technology was not considered for the series, with Farahani stating it was not "creatively super-relevant" for what was desired.

Post-production 
Herron began editing what had already been filmed during the production shutdown, which helped inform her, Martin, and Wright on what needed to be reworked or added once filming resumed to fit the series' intended tone. One of these aspects was Loki and Sylvie's relationship. Paul Zucker, Calum Ross, and Emma McCleave serve as editors. The series was completed on June 20, 2021. Visual effects were provided by Cantina Creative, Crafty Apes, Digital Domain, FuseFX, Industrial Light & Magic, Luma Pictures, Method Studios, Rise, Rodeo FX, and Trixter. The TVA's time doors were inspired by the shield practice scene from Dune (1984), with 150 versions of how the doors appeared created to test which would work the best.

Music 

Natalie Holt began working on a "suite of themes" for Loki, Mobius, the TVA, and Sylvie in August 2020, starting with music for the final episode and working backwards to the first episode, which helped create a "blueprint" for her score that had an "overarching narrative". Herron used these samples of music to help "shape the tone" and emotions of the series. Holt and Herron were both drawn to using the theremin for the series' music, with Holt believing the instrument's "character" was suited for the series and the score. Charlie Draper served as the theremin player on the score, assisting Holt with converting the score to the instrument's lower bass range. Holt's score combines the theremin with an orchestra (performed by the Budapest Film Orchestra), analog synthesizers, clock sounds, and Scandinavian folk instruments, much of which was created and contributed remotely while Holt worked in her studio in London. The scores for the final two episodes also feature a 32-person choir. Herron said Holt's music for Loki was "operatic and bold", as well as "very layered and electronic with a dark, strange energy" that was a good fit for the character.

Likening Loki to a Machiavellian character, Holt wanted his theme to have "gravitas and classical weight" in addition to a "space-age sound". She cited Wendy Carlos's Moog synthesizer sounds in A Clockwork Orange (1971) as an influence, since Holt saw similarities between Loki and that film's protagonist Alex. Holt also wanted to "juxtapose" and "interplay" Loki's theme with the TVA theme. Clock sounds were included since the concept of time was central to the series, and they appear in the TVA theme which Holt wanted to be "grand, almost like a religious experience" with "these huge swells of cords" and "ornaments and grand gestures", taking inspiration from "Ride of the Valkyries" by Richard Wagner. The theme has a "slightly grainy, faded [and] vintage-y sci-fi sound" to reflect the analog nature of the TVA, with Holt creating a "low-fi demo version" of the theme that was mainly synthesizers and had an analog tape sound that was kept for the opening title cards, while the full orchestral version of the theme was used for the end title sequence.

The Norwegian instruments, including the hardanger fiddle and stringed nyckelharpa, were used to represent Asgard and Loki's mother Frigga, as well as Sylvie's theme, which Holt described as "very dark, orchestral, driving, and murderous". Sylvie and Frigga's themes are connected, and Holt wanted to "feel that sense of past and sense of history and this emotional grounding" between the two. Frigga's theme was originally written on the violin, with Norwegian player Erik Rydvall aiding Holt by playing the theme on the hardanger fiddle and adding "some heart" and folk ornamentation. For Mobius, Holt listened to Bon Jovi and other 1990s rock music to create his "sound palette", while Renslayer's theme is "like a high organ" and is tied to Mobius's. Hunter B-15's theme was based in a drum rhythm, with Holt sampling her voice in various layers to create "this horrible sliding sound with this driving rhythm underneath it".

The score for the season was released digitally by Marvel Music and Hollywood Records in two volumes: music from the first three episodes was released on July 2, 2021, and music from the last three episodes was released on July 23. The first episode's end credits track "TVA" was released as a single on June 11.

Marketing 
Select members of Disney's marketing team were given access to scripts and information on the seson when it began filming to start crafting its marketing campaign based on its release date. Asad Ayaz, Walt Disney Studios marketing president, and his team worked closely with Feige, D'Esposito, Herron, and Waldron to determine what information would be part of the campaign, while coordinating around the efforts of previous Disney+ series that were releasing before Loki to give those their "fair time". A commercial for the season, The Falcon and the Winter Soldier, and WandaVision was shown during Super Bowl LIV. Julia Alexander of The Verge said the footage "wasn't much" but offered "enough glimpses to tease fans". Haleigh Foutch at Collider felt of all the Super Bowl commercials, Marvel's teasers "stole the whole show" and had "a lot to get excited about".

A trailer for the season was released during Disney Investor Day in December 2020. Writers for Polygon said Loki "finally feels untethered by the grounded approaches of the early Thor movies", and based on the content of the trailer and given the season deals with alternate realities, the season might try to "explain" certain phenomena such as Loki being D. B. Cooper or features worlds where urban legends such as the fictitious video game Polybius exist. John Boon writing for Entertainment Tonight called the trailer a "bonkers first look". /Films Hoai-Tran Bui said the scenes in the trailer was "very intriguing, cryptic stuff" and was surprised to learn the season was more than "just the time-hopping series we assumed" and would deal "with mysterious conspiracies and reality-bending organizations".

A second trailer for the series was released on April 5, 2021. Charles Pulliam-Moore of io9 called the trailer "a large-scale, time-hopping adventure with the promise to be Disney+'s next big epic". Pulliam-Moore's colleague Jame Whitbrook said the trailer was "big on mystery" and was clearer than the first about the TVA's role in the series, but it was still unclear what Loki gained "beyond the chance to enact his own brand of chaos across an entire multiverse of timelines". Polygons Austen Goslin said it appeared Loki would be visiting past memorable moments from MCU films, calling Loki "a sci-fi, reality-hopping, heist series". Bui felt this trailer gave a better understanding of how Loki would get involved with the TVA than the first trailer did.

A poster for the season was revealed in May 2021, which featured Loki, Mobius M. Mobius, Ravonna Lexus Renslayer, and Hunter B-15, as well as Miss Minutes, the animated anthropomorphic orange clock that is the TVA's mascot. Commentators were drawn to Miss Minutes, thinking it would be viewers' favorite new character, with /Films Chris Evangelista loving the mascot despite its weirdness and not being convinced it was a clock. Erin Brady at Collider thought Miss Minutes would try to "steal Baby Yoda's thunder", while Adele Ankers of IGN believed the mascot was a hint towards the various realities the season would explore, despite not knowing what role Miss Minutes would have in the series. Two episodes of the series Marvel Studios: Legends were released on June 4, 2021, exploring Loki and the Tesseract using footage from their MCU film appearances. On July 9, a ceramic piece by João Lemos and the Viúva Lamego ceramic factory debuted in Marquês de Pombal Square in Lisbon. Crafting a campaign for a television series, rather a film's opening weekend, necessitated Ayaz and his team to be cognizant of spoilers in the lead up to Lokis release, while new marketing materials released post-episodes covered characters or moments revealed in the previous episode. In June 2021, The Simpsons short film The Good, the Bart, and the Loki was announced, which would release alongside "Journey into Mystery" on Disney+. The short sees Loki teaming up with Bart Simpson in a crossover that pays homage to the heroes and villains of the MCU. Hiddleston reprises his role as Loki in the short.

In January 2021, Marvel announced their "Marvel Must Haves" program, which reveals new toys, games, books, apparel, home decor, and other merchandise related to each episode of Loki following an episode's release. The first merchandise was revealed on June 7, 2021, which included Funko Pops, Marvel Legends figures, pins, apparel, and accessories for the series, while General Mills and Marvel announced that they would release 3,500 specially branded boxes of Lucky Charms cereal, titled "Loki Charms", on the same day as the series' release. The "Must Haves" merchandise for the episodes started on June 11 and concluded on July 16. Later in the month, Hyundai Motor Company released a commercial featuring Hiddleston as Loki promoting the series and the Hyundai Tucson. The commercial was produced by Marvel alongside similar commercials for WandaVision, The Falcon and the Winter Soldier, and What If...?, and was meant to tell an "in-world" story set within the narrative of the season. It received 2 million views within 24 hours of its release. With the release of each episode, Loki's appearance and costumes in Disneyland's Avengers Campus updated each week to reflect the events of the episode.

Release 
The first season debuted on Disney+ on June 9, 2021, and released weekly on Wednesdays, with the six-episode first season concluding on July 14. It is part of Phase Four of the MCU. It had previously been announced to debut in May 2021, before it was shifted to June 11, 2021 for releases on Friday, and then to two days before that.

Reception

Audience viewership 
Disney CEO Bob Chapek announced that "Glorious Purpose" was the most-watched series premiere for the streaming service in its opening week. Nielsen Media Research, who measure the number of minutes watched by United States audiences on television sets, listed Loki as the third-most watched original series across streaming services for the week of June 7–13, with "Glorious Purpose" accumulating 731 million minutes viewed, which was more than the premieres of The Falcon and the Winter Soldier (495million minutes) and WandaVision (434million). According to Samba TV, "For All Time. Always." was viewed in 1.9 million U.S. households from July 14–18, surpassing the finales for WandaVision (1.4 million) and The Falcon and the Winter Soldier (1.7 million). In May 2022, Feige announced that Loki was the most-watched Marvel Studios Disney+ series to date.

Critical response 

The review aggregator website Rotten Tomatoes reports a 92% approval rating with an average rating of 7.9/10, based on 331 reviews. The critical consensus reads, "A delightful diversion from the MCU as we know it, Loki successfully sees star Tom Hiddleston leap from beloved villain to endearing antihero—with a little help from Owen Wilson—in a series that's as off-kilter, charming, and vaguely dangerous as the demigod himself." Metacritic, which uses a weighted average, assigned a score of 74 out of 100 based on 32 critics, indicating "generally favorable reviews".

For the series' first two episodes, reviewers highlighted the banter and relationship between Hiddleston's Loki and Wilson's Mobius. The various design elements of Loki, particularly the production design from Kasra Farahani and the cinematography from Autumn Durald Arkapaw, were also praised.

TVLines Matt Webb Mitovitch gave the first two episodes a "B+". He felt Hiddleston "effortlessly slips back" into this version of Loki and explained that the banter between Hiddleston and Wilson was "a significant upgrade from what Falcon and Winter Soldier believed it was doing". Mitovitch concluded that once the premise has been established, Loki gets " fun", with each episode "building to a tantalizing, two-pronged reveal... that opens up all kinds of possibilities" for the remainder of the series. Daniel Fienberg of The Hollywood Reporter said in his review, "After two episodes, Loki is at a tipping point. Having set everything up to an exhausting degree, things could be lined up to get really entertaining – if not zany in a Rick and Morty way, perhaps fun in some of the timeline rupture-of-the-week ways [of] The CW's Legends of Tomorrow... Or Loki might just be a lot of Hiddleston and Wilson talking, which might still be engaging for six episodes." Nick Allen, reviewing for RogerEbert.com, called Loki "an exciting and genuinely inspired addition to Marvel storytelling, one that spins off and rockets its complicated villain into original territory with the help of time travel" adding the series was "bound to be a sci-fi gem".

Reviewing the first two episodes for Variety, Caroline Framke was more reserved on how successful the series would be, feeling the "dense" first episode had a lot of ground to cover, while the second "was far more engaging" and able to have more fun, ending on a tease of "an intriguing new direction", though she cautioned that the series may ultimately not "deviate from the usual script". Giving the episodes a "C", Ben Travers at IndieWire felt the series was "any movie or TV show where a criminal is enlisted by the authorities to help solve a difficult case" with little story progress made over the first two episodes, instead using "exhausting" explanations. He added, "Loki isn't really about Loki, so much as it's about introducing the TVA, the logistics of time travel, and how the MCU's Phase 4 timeline will end up with a Multiverse of Madness".

Holt's score for the series was also widely praised, with Jillian Unrau of GameRant stating Holt "has done an outstanding job in making the music complement the story, as well as be iconic on its own".

In her review for the final episode of the season, Caroline Siede at The A.V. Club felt the series had been "both unpredictable and weirdly straightforward; bold in its game-changing moves yet inconsequential in so many of its narrative choices". Giving the season an 8 out of 10, Simon Cardy of IGN said compared to the previous two Marvel Studios series which were "more introspective pieces", Loki took viewers "to new places to meet new people; not only making for an enjoyable watch in its own right, but also providing excitement through the promise of what's to come". Cardy praised Hiddleston's performance, noting playing the 2012 version of the character "makes for a more entertaining centerpiece", as well as praising Wilson and Di Martino for their roles and chemistry with Hiddleston, and highlighting Arkapaw's cinematography. In his review of the season, The Verges Andrew Webster explained that Loki made him "forget about the rest of the Marvel Cinematic Universe" since it was "an excellent piece of science fiction" that was the most standalone entry of the MCU to date, believing it was a good entry point to the MCU since it is "the best of what the superhero genre has to offer without all of the homework". Webster also praised the cast who all looked like they were "having a lot of fun", mentioning that "Hiddleston adds a depth to Loki that we haven't seen yet... and he has a magnetic chemistry with both Wilson and Di Martino".

Analysis 
Ahead of the series' release, Sam Barsanti at The A.V. Club noted how the potential for various alternate versions of Loki to appear in the series and continue on in the MCU was "a smart way to maintain Loki's presence in the MCU without worrying about keeping Hiddleston under contract or having to continue explaining that  Loki—even though he's played by Hiddleston—is not the same Loki that got killed by Thanos", and would follow suit with WandaVision and The Falcon and the Winter Soldier both revealing new incarnations of existing heroes. Barsanti was excited by the prospect of potentially seeing Old Man Loki (rumored at the time to be played by Grant), the heroic Kid Loki (who could be another potential member of the Young Avengers team that Marvel Studios had been teasing) and in particular, Lady Loki (rumored as Di Martino's role). Since Lady Loki is "generally more of an unrepentant villain than other Lokis", it would be a way for Marvel Studios to update the Loki character and have them be a villain without "[negating] the growth that Hiddleston's Loki went through". Writing for The Verge, Chaim Gartenberg believed heading into the series that Loki felt like "a capital-S Spinoff" more so than WandaVision and The Falcon and the Winter Soldier, both of which served as lead ins to feature films. As such, being somewhat more disconnected could allow Marvel the opportunity to "make a more standalone series that can actually be a good TV show", believing like in the comics, standalone stories sometimes produce the better stories than "the 1,000-issue epics".

After the first episode, Richard Newby at The Hollywood Reporter believed the series was promising a "grand expansion" of MCU lore that would "supersede anything Marvel Studios has ever attempted with a single [MCU] entry" stating Loki felt "cosmically big, yet at the same time, [still] deeply personal". Particular lore items Newby was keen to keep an eye on were Nexus Points, that could have connections to WandaVision, and how those could lead to the creations of multiverses, and the multiversal war, which could be a reference to a future Secret Wars-type event that would "rewrite reality" and "make the quest for the Infinity Stones seem small in comparison".

Ben Child of The Guardian criticized Loki's return as part of a pattern of MCU characters making appearances after their onscreen deaths, citing characters' returns from the Blip, the return of Natasha Romanoff in the prequel Black Widow, and the appearance of versions of Vision in WandaVision, saying it "spoil[s] the gorgeous pathos of all those death scenes" and that "all bets are off with future resurrection methods".

Following "The Nexus Event", which saw the Time-Keepers revealed to be animatronics and Loki appear on a desolate world with other Loki variants after being pruned, Newby opined that the Beyonder and Battleworld could factor into the series. Adam B. Vary and Mónica Marie Zorrilla of Variety disagreed with Newby, pointing out that, with Marvel Studios' previous series, they did not weave "complicated, brand new characters as central figures" such as the Beyonder this late into a series. The pair did believe Kang the Conqueror could be a factor, since the character "[made] sense from the comics... [and] for the MCU" as he had stronger ties to elements of Loki, such as a relationship with Ravonna in the comics, and would be appearing in Ant-Man and the Wasp: Quantumania portrayed by Majors. A variant of Kang appears in the final episode, He Who Remains, also portrayed by Majors. Newby noted how this time the fan theories panned out, but with "an unexpected twist". Knowing Majors would also be appearing as Kang, Newby was excited by Majors's "unique chance... to play different versions of one character, each potentially more frightening than the last". David Opie of Digital Spy criticized the introduction of He Who Remains, saying it "came completely out of nowhere" for non-comics readers, despite conceding that the speculation surrounding the character's appearance was correct.

Accolades 

By April 2022, Marvel Studios and Disney had decided to submit Loki in the various drama series categories for the Primetime Emmy Awards, rather than in the limited series categories. Disney had previously planned to submit the series in the limited series categories along with Hawkeye and Moon Knight. Clayton Davis at Variety noted that the reveal of a second season in the post-credits scene of the season one finale and the Academy of Television Arts & Sciences rules for entering a series in the limited series categories left the studios with "no other choice" than to submit in the drama or comedy categories, choosing the drama ones, which Davis felt was "the smarter choice".

Documentary special 

In February 2021, the documentary series Marvel Studios: Assembled was announced. The special on this series, Assembled: The Making of Loki, goes behind the scenes of the making of the season, featuring Waldron, Herron, Hiddleston, Mbatha-Raw, Mosaku, Wilson, Di Martino, Oparei, Grant, and Majors. The special was released on Disney+ on July 21, 2021.

Notes

References

External links 
 

2021 American television seasons
 
Marvel Cinematic Universe: Phase Four mass media